Xanthippe or Xantippe (from Greek Ξανθίππη) was the wife of Socrates.

Xanthippe or Xantippe may also refer to:
Xanthippe (mythology), three figures in Greek mythology
Acts of Xanthippe, Polyxena, and Rebecca, New Testament apocrypha that dates from the third or fourth century
156 Xanthippe, an asteroid
Xanthippe (mite), a genus of mites in the family Ascidae
Xantippe (moth), a genus of moths in the family Pyralidae
Xanthippe's shrew a mammal in the family Soricidae found in Kenya and Tanzania.
Arta epicoenalis (synonyms Xantippe beatifica and Xantippe descansalis), a species of snout moth
Heliades mulleolella (synonym Xantippe uranides) a species of moth of the family Pyralidae.
Xantippe, Western Australia a village in Western Australia
Xantippe Saunders, an American portrait painter and art teacher 
Xanthippe Voorhees, a character on the Netflix series Unbreakable Kimmy Schmidt